Tungkadeh, commonly known as Mabohai, is a small neighbourhood in Bandar Seri Begawan, the capital of Brunei. It is officially a village subdivision under Kianggeh, a mukim (subdistrict) of Brunei-Muara District. The postcodes for Tungkadeh are BA1111 and BA1311.

Name 

See also 

 List of neighbourhoods in Bandar Seri Begawan

References 

Neighbourhoods in Bandar Seri Begawan
Villages in Brunei-Muara District